Ronald Paul Raper (born 22 November 1945) is an Australian former rugby league footballer, and coach from the 1960s and 1970s.

Background
Born in Camperdown, in inner-western Sydney into a working-class family of nine boys, he played junior football for the East Hills Bulldogs before representing Canterbury's President’s Cup side in 1964.

Playing career
The younger brother of the legendary Johnny Raper, he gave great service as a lock forward for Canterbury-Bankstown joining them in 1964.

He played seven first grade seasons for Canterbury between 1966-1972 and played lock in the 1967 Grand Final.

In 1965, Ron started the year in reserve grade and emerged as a talent during the season. In 1966, Ron received the opportunity to play first grade against Newtown when George Taylforth was relegated.

He secured a first grade position for the next seven seasons.

In 1967, he played in all first grade games including the Grand Final against South Sydney. After missing two games in 1968, he played 85 consecutive first grade games between 1968 and 1971.

In 1970, he was appointed captain of the first grade team and captained Canterbury on 27 occasions. He played in the winning Pre-Season Final against St. George and also played in the Semi-Final against St. George.

Injuries finally caught up with Raper in 1971 and after losing his first grade position midway through 1972, he left the club to play for Ryde-Eastwood for the remainder of the season leading them to the Second Division Premiership.

Raper played 168 games for Canterbury and scored 333 points during his career.

He was awarded the Canterbury 'player of the year' in 1967.

In 1973, Raper moved to Brisbane to play for the Redcliffe Dolphins. He represented Queensland in two appearances that year and was unlucky to miss selection on the 1973 Kangaroo tour after breaking his arm in Redcliffe's BRL grand final loss to Valleys.

He became coach of the Wests Panthers in 1975 where he guided them to back to back BRL Premierships in 75 and 76 after Wests finished wooden spooners in 1974.

In 2004, Raper was nominated for the Canterbury Bankstown Berries to Bulldogs 70 Year Team of Champions.

On Sunday 31 July 2016, Raper received the great honour of having the old seniors field at Purtell Park, Bardon named after him. The field was named Erica Quinn and Ron Raper Oval and was named after Ron in recognition of his services to the Wests Panthers throughout the 1970s, 1980s and 1990s.

References

1945 births
Living people
Australian rugby league coaches
Australian rugby league players
Canterbury-Bankstown Bulldogs players
Queensland rugby league team players
Ron
Redcliffe Dolphins players
Rugby league locks
Rugby league players from Sydney
Wests Panthers coaches